Ileana Nikki Saros (born 1950) is a former state government official. She served as Deputy Attorney General in New Jersey. Saros also served as president of the National Association of Medicaid Fraud Control Units (NAMFCU). She was the first woman to serve in that role.

Early life and education

Saros graduated from the Beard School (now Morristown-Beard School) in Orange, NJ in 1968. She then completed her bachelor's degree at Chatham College (now Chatham University) in 1972. Saros earned her law degree from Rutgers University's School of Law in Newark, NJ in 1975. In 2008, Morristown-Beard School awarded her their Distinguished Alumni Award.

Service in state government

Saros worked in the New Jersey state government for 30 years. She served as Deputy Attorney General to the Division for Criminal Justice in the New Jersey Attorney General's (NJAG) office. Saros also served as chief of NJAG's Drug Diversion Unit, headed the Medicaid Fraud Control Unit and served as lead counsel for the New Jersey State Commission of Investigation. In 2003, she served as the commission's lead investigator for an investigation into animal cruelty.

Saros led NAMFCU's work on nursing home reform, and testified before a U.S. House of Representatives committee overseeing reforms. These activities facilitated passage of the Nursing Home Reform Act of 1987 (NHRA). NHRA required nursing homes to run facilities supporting a high quality of life, mental and physical health, and residents' participation in administration. Saros also drafted legislation to criminalize elderly abuse, which New Jersey later enacted.

Volunteer roles

Saros has served on the board of directors of the Newfound Area Nursing Association in Bristol, NH. The association provides home healthcare to families in the area. In 1992, Saros served as one of the founding Board Members of the Greek American Chamber of Commerce in New Jersey.

References

American lawyers
Rutgers School of Law–Newark alumni
Chatham University alumni
1950 births
Living people
American women lawyers
Morristown-Beard School alumni
21st-century American women